Jehle was an automotive company based in Schaan, Liechtenstein, that operated during the late 1970s to the early 1990s. Founded by Xavier Jehle, it was only one of two automotive companies ever to be based in Liechtenstein; the other was Orca Engineering.

History
Jehle started with two variations on the buggy concept: the Mathies-Buggy and the Jehle Safari. The Mathies-Buggy was not driven by the typical Volkswagen Beetle engine, but rather the flat Volkswagen Bus 1600 cc engine, while the Safari was a Citroën-Boxer-based fun car similar to the Citroën Méhari, Both were sold as kits. One model, the Saphier, was a wedge-shaped coupe, whose upper body section opened completely for access to the cockpit; it was offered in a variety of configurations. The basic model was built on a VW Beetle floor plan with a turbocharged Volkswagen Golf engine, while at the upper end of the lineup was a mid-engine model with monocoque construction, and a tuned 5-liter Ford V8. The company also built a prototype V12 coupe reminiscent of the Lamborghini Countach, but with insignificant funds to finish the prototype Jehle folded.

References

External links
Lawrence, Mike, A to Z of Sports Cars. Bideford: Bay View Books, 1991. 
Auto Katalog Motorbuch-Verlag 1979 to 1992
 Bill Hartford: Imports & Motorsports (Kolumne). In Popular Mechanics. September 1982, Band 158, Nr. 3, ISSN 0032-4558, p. 14

Vehicle manufacturing companies established in 1970
Car manufacturers of Liechtenstein
Defunct motor vehicle manufacturers of Liechtenstein
1970 establishments in Liechtenstein
Schaan